Finaro (the trading name of Credorax, Inc.), is an Israel-based online merchant acquiring bank and payment service provider (PSP). The company was established in 2007 by Benny Nachman. The company operates in the European Union, United States, and China.

History
Credorax was founded as a financial technology startup in 2007, in Southborough Massachusetts by Benny Nachman. From its start, the company launched and developed as an online acquiring bank acting as an intermediary between issuing banks or payment service providers and e-commerce merchants. The initial funding was provided by Blumberg Capital. By 2014, the company received nearly $130 million in venture funding from Blumberg Capital, FTV capital and other investment firms.

In 2010, the company was licensed to operate under the EU Payment Services Directive (PSD). In 2014, it obtained commercial banking license in Japan and in 2015, the company received a commercial banking license in Malta allowing it to operate within the European Union. Processing a volume of over $4.3 Billion in 2019.

Services
In technological terms, Finaro is both an acquiring merchant bank and a payment processing provider (PSP), via its payment gateway technology, Source, which facilitates multi-channel payment processing, fraud and risk management services. According to a Nilson Report, in 2019 Credorax introduced bank account facilities for its clients.

References

Payment service providers
Merchant services
Financial technology companies
Financial services companies established in 2007
Financial software companies